Elitsa Kostova was the defending champion from the event's previous edition as an ITF Women's Circuit tournament, but lost in the first round of qualifying to Barbora Štefková.

First-seeded Tímea Babos won the title, defeating Lucie Šafářová in the final, 6–7(4–7), 6–4, 6–3.

Seeds

Draw

Finals

Top half

Bottom half

Qualifying

Seeds

Qualifiers

Draw

First qualifier

Second qualifier

Third qualifier

Fourth qualifier

Fifth qualifier

Sixth qualifier

External links
Main draw
Qualifying draw

Hungarian Ladies Open - Singles
Hungarian Ladies Open
Lad